René Perin (1 November 1774 – 9 May 1858) was a 19th-century French playwright, publisher, translator and novelist.

Biography 
A lawyer and sous-préfet of Montluçon during the Hundred Days, he resigned from his positions when the Bourbons returned to power. He used several pseudonyms such as René de Biborium-Chateauterne or René Biborium de Chateauterne as a writer. His plays were presented on the most important Parisian stages of his time including the Théâtre de l'Ambigu-Comique, the Théâtre du Vaudeville, the Théâtre de l'Odéon, the Théâtre de la Gaîté, and the Théâtre des Variétés.

For thirty years he was a collaborator to the Moniteur, and he also wrote historical and geographical studies.

Works 

 Mr Jocrisse au sérail de Constantinople ou les Bêtises sont de tous les pays, calembour en trois actes, 1800
 Kosmouk, ou les Indiens à Marseille, comedy in 5 acts and in prose, arrangement of the play by Kotzebue, 1801
 Les Nouveaux athées, ou Réfutation des nouveaux saints, ouvrage en moins de 250 vers, enrichi de notes curieuses et historiques, 1801
 Respirons !, comedy in 1 act and in prose, mingled with vaudevilles, 1801
 Tous les niais de Paris, ou le Catafalque de Cadet-Roussel, bluette tragique in 5 acts and in verses, with Pillon-Duchemin, 1801
 L'incendie du Cap, ou Le règne de Toussaint-Louverture, 1802
 Le flageolet d'Erato, ou le chansonnier du vaudeville, 1802
 La Grande ville, ou les Parisiens vengés, comédie épisodique in 3 acts, in prose, with Anne-Adrien-Firmin Pillon-Duchemin, 1802
 Fitz Henri, drama in 3 acts, 1803
 Le Voyage autour de ma chambre, comédie en vaudeville in 1 act, 1803
 Molé aux Champs-Élysées, hommage en vers, mingled with songs and danses, with Pillon-Duchemin, 1803
 La mort de Cadet Roussel, tragédie pour rire in 5 acts and in verses, with Pillon-Duchemin, 1803
 L'Hermitage des Pyrénées, comedy in 1 act, mingled with song, 1805
 L'isle flottante, ou Les Voyageurs aériens, comédie féerie and extravaganza, in 1 act and in prose, 1806
 Jules, ou le Toit paternel, melodrama in 3 acts, with Rougemont, 1806
 Héléonor de Portugal, melodrama in 3 acts, extravaganza, 1807
 Les Comédiens par hasard, comedy in 1 act and in prose, 1807
 Les Suites d'un duel, comedy in 3 acts, in prose, 1807
 Le Concert de la rue Feydeau ou la Folie du jour, comedy in 1 act, in prose, with Nicolas Cammaille-Saint-Aubin, 1807
 L'Héroïsme des femmes, melodrama in 3 acts, extravaganza, ornated with song and dances, 1808
 J'arrive à temps, vaudeville in 1 act, 1808
 Cosme de Médicis, melodrama in 3 acts, in prose and extravaganza, with Marie-Adélaïde Barthélemy-Hadot, 1809
 Vie militaire de J. Lannes, maréchal de l'empire, duc de Montebello, 1809
 Sophie ou La nouvelle Cendrillon, comedy in 4 acts and in prose, with Rougemont, 1810
 Itinéraire de Pantin au Mont Calvaire en passant par la rue Mouffetard, le faubourg St-Marceau, le faubourg St-Jacques... ou Lettres inédites de Chactas à Atala, 1811
 Le Libelle, comedy in 1 act, in verses, 1811
 Ode sur la naissance du roi de Rome, 1811
 Beautés historiques de la maison d'Autriche... à l'usage de la jeunesse, 1811
 Esprit de J.-F. de La Harpe, 1814
 L'Intrigue avant la noce, comedy in 3 acts, 1814
 Henri IV et d'Aubigné, comedy in 3 acts and in prose, with Michel-Nicolas Balisson de Rougemont, 1814
 Dictionnaire des girouettes, ou Nos contemporains peints d'après eux-mêmes, with Pierre-Joseph Charrin, Alexis Eymery, César de Proisy d'Eppe, 1815
 Le Vieil oncle, comedy in 1 act and in prose, 1816
 Le Garçon Sans-Souci, ou Aventures sur aventures, humorous novel in 3 acts, 1818
 La Maison de Jeanne d'Arc, comédie anecdote in 1 act, in prose, 1818
 La Demande bizarre, comedy in 1 act, in prose, 1819
 La Bataille de Bouvines, ou le Rocher des tombeaux, mimodrame in 3 acts, extravaganza, with Ferdinand Laloue, 1821
 Isabelle de Levanzo, ou la Fille écuyer, melodrama in 3 acts and extravaganza, with Alexandre-Joseph Le Roy de Bacre, 1821
 La Cousine supposée, comedy in 1 act and in prose, with Adrien Payn, 1823
 Traits détachés de l'histoire, pour l'instruction de la jeunesse, et faisant suite à l'Éducation complète, ou Cours d'histoire universelle mêlé de chronologie, de Mme Le Prince de Beaumont, gathered by René Périn, 1825
 La laitière de Montfermeil, 1827
 Abrégé de la géographie sacrée, 1827
 La laitière de Montfermeil, vaudeville in 5 years, with Rougemont and Nicolas Brazier, 1827
 Le Noble et l'artisan, ou le Parent de tout le monde, comédie-vaudeville in 2 acts, with Théodore Anne, 1831
 Sophie et Mirabeau, ou 1773 et 1789, comédie-vaudeville in 2 acts, with Théodore Anne and Emmanuel Théaulon, 1831
 Album du Nouveau-Bellevue, 1836
 Jeanne d'Arc en prison, monologue in 1 act and in verses, with Élie Sauvage, 1844
 M. Lafleur, comédie-vaudeville in 1 act, with Paul Siraudin, 1844
 Le Goguettier sévrien, undated

Bibliography 
 Joseph Fr. Michaud, Louis Gabriel Michaud, Biographie universelle ancienne et moderne, vol.32, 1843, p. 493
 Jean-Marie Thomasseau, Le mélodrame, P.U.F, 1984, p. 50

External links 
 René Perin on Data.bnf.fr

19th-century French dramatists and playwrights
French publishers (people)
19th-century French novelists
1774 births
Writers from Paris
1858 deaths
19th-century French translators